XHSCBS-FM is a community radio station on 98.9 FM in Tarandacuao, Guanajuato. The station is owned by the civil association Enlace Taranda, A.C.

History
Enlace Taranda filed for a community station on May 13, 2016. The station was awarded on April 25, 2018.

References

Radio stations in Guanajuato
Community radio stations in Mexico

Radio stations established in 2018